The 1975 Canadian Open was the second edition of the professional invitational snooker tournament, the Canadian Open, which took place between 13 August and 1 September 1975. It was also referred to as the "Plus Cigarettes International".

Alex Higgins won the title defeating John Pulman 15–7 in the final. 81 players entered. There was a total prize fund of $10,000, with $5,000 awarded to the winner and $2,000 for the runner-up. Cliff Thorburn compiled the highest  of the tournament, 142.

Main draw
Results of the tournament are shown below. Numbers in parentheses indicate seedings.

References

1975 in snooker
Open
Open